Nioaque is a municipality located in the Brazilian state of Mato Grosso do Sul. Its population was 13,862 (2020) and its area is 3,924 km².

References

Municipalities in Mato Grosso do Sul